Ernest-Aimé Feydeau (16 March 182127 October 1873) was a French writer and the father of the noted comic playwright Georges Feydeau.

Biography
Feydeau was born in Paris, and he began his literary career in 1844, by the publication of a volume of poetry, Les Nationales. Either the partial failure of this literary effort, or his marriage soon afterwards to a daughter of the economist, Blanqui, caused him to devote himself to finance and to archaeology.

He gained a great success with his novel Fanny (1858), a success due chiefly to the cleverness with which it depicted and excused the corrupt manners of a certain portion of French society. In 1861 he married Léocadie Bogaslawa, née Zelewska (1838–1924). This was followed in rapid succession by a series of fictions, similar in character, but wanting the attraction of novelty; none of them enjoyed the same vogue as Fanny. Besides his novels Feydeau wrote several plays, and he is also the author of Histoire générale des usages funèbres et des sépultures des peuples anciens (3 vols., 1857–1861); Le Secret du bonheur (sketches of Algerian life) (2 vols., 1864); and L'Allemagne en 1871 (1872), a clever caricature of German life and manners. He died in Paris.

References
 
 Sainte-Beuve, English Portraits (New York, 1875) and Essays on Men and Women (London, 1890) (in French Causeries du lundi, vol. xiv.)
 Barbey d'Aurevilly, Les Oeuvres et les hommes au XIXe siècle (19th Century Works and Men).

External links
 
 

French travel writers
French antiquarians
1821 births
1873 deaths
19th-century French novelists
French male novelists
19th-century French male writers
French male non-fiction writers